2014–15 Guam Soccer League, officially named Budweiser Guam Soccer League due to sponsorship reason, is the association football league of Guam.

External links
FIFA
RSSSF
Soccerway

Guam Soccer League seasons
1
Guam